The Victorian Academy of Music was a theatre in Bourke Street, Melbourne, built for Samuel Aarons in 1876.
It was also advertised as the Bijou Theatre, as if to distinguish it from the larger Theatre Royal and Opera House, then in 1880 the "Academy" title was dropped. 
In June 1884 it was purchased for £47,000 by John Alfred Wilson (c. 1832 – 23 September 1915), owner of nearby Academy of Music (later Palace) Hotel and Gaiety Theatre, all on Bourke Street.

The first lessee was G. B. W. Lewis, who staged concerts and plays on alternate evenings. Lewis was followed in 1885 by the Majeronis, who had often played in that theatre. Business was slow however, and when Majeroni fell behind in the rent, Wilson transferred the lease to Brough and Boucicault.

The theatre was destroyed by fire on Easter Monday, 1889.
A new, larger Bijou Theatre was built on the site, opening in 1890. The new theatre seated around 2,000 across three levels. 
The Bijou was the scene of Louis De Rougement's brief appearance on the Australian stage — no sooner did he start to recount details of his amazing adventures than he was mercilessly howled down by the audience.

The theatre was further renovated and altered in 1907. It was demolished in 1934, a few weeks after the Royal, opposite.

References

History of Melbourne
Former theatres in Melbourne
Demolished buildings and structures in Melbourne
Buildings and structures demolished in 1934